RV David Thompson is a Parks Canada mid-shore scientific research and survey vessel, that entered service in 2016. The vessel was formerly a fisheries patrol vessel of the Canadian Coast Guard named CCGS Arrow Post.

Description
The ship is powered by one Caterpillar 3512 geared diesel engine rated at  driving a single controllable pitch propeller  and a bow thruster. The ship is also equipped with two Caterpillar 3306 generators and one Caterpillar 3406 emergency generator.

David Thompson is equipped with two rigid-hulled inflatable boats and has one HIAB seacrane capable of lifting . The ship has a complement of six, and while with the Canadian Coast Guard operated with three officer and three crew. David Thompson has six berths.

Service history
Arrow Post was ordered by the Canadian Coast Guard from Hike Metal Products for construction at their yard in Wheatley, Ontario with the yard number 93. The ship was launched and completed in 1991.  The ship was commissioned in 1992. The ship was based in Prince Rupert in British Columbia and registered in Ottawa, Ontario. In Coast Guard service, Arrow Post was primarily used for fisheries patrol. However, the ship was also used to carry out scientific research.

Arrow Post was refit in 2012 by Allied Shipbuilders. In October 2014, Arrow Post was one of the Coast Guard vessels used to monitor the disabled Russian merchant vessel  after Simishur lost power off Haida Gwaii.

In 2016, Arrow Post was transferred from the Canadian Coast Guard to Parks Canada. The vessel was refitted as a research vessel by Canadian Maritime Engineering of Nanaimo, British Columbia beginning in April 2017.

Notes

Citations

External links

 Track RV David Thompson online

Ships of the Canadian Coast Guard
1992 ships
Ships built in British Columbia